Ctenardisia is a genus of flowering plants belonging to the family Primulaceae.

Its native range is Mexico to Brazil.

Species:

Ctenardisia amplifolia 
Ctenardisia ovandensis 
Ctenardisia purpusii 
Ctenardisia speciosa 
Ctenardisia stenobotrys

References

Primulaceae
Primulaceae genera
Taxa named by Adolpho Ducke